State Route 147 (SR 147) is a state highway serving the Las Vegas Valley in southern Nevada. It is signed as Lake Mead Boulevard and runs from Interstate 15 (I-15) and U.S. Route 93 (US 93) in North Las Vegas east to the border of the Lake Mead National Recreation Area. It is not to be confused with Lake Mead Parkway (formerly Lake Mead Drive), which also goes to Lake Mead but mainly runs in southern Las Vegas Valley and carries the designation of State Route 564.

Lake Mead Boulevard became a state highway in 1978, but the highway never had markers posted to identify it as a state highway.

Route description

State Route 147 begins at Interstate 15 and U.S. Route 93 in North Las Vegas. From there, SR 147 has an intersection at Las Vegas Boulevard (SR 604) and Civic Center Drive (former SR 607). Traveling further east, SR 147 leaves the city of North Las Vegas as it enters the unincorporated town of Sunrise Manor where it has intersections at Lamb Boulevard and Nellis Boulevard (SR 612). The highway then leaves the unincorporated town of Sunrise Manor as it travels through the Frenchman Mountain on its northern slope. The road then curves into a southeastern direction where the highway ends near the Lake Mead NRA as Lake Mead Boulevard continues beyond the highway's eastern terminus.

History

SR 147 first appears on the official Nevada state highway map with the 1978-79 edition as a semi-circular route.  The route followed Lake Mead Boulevard (which was previously unnumbered) eastward from North Las Vegas to North Shore Road in the Lake Mead National Recreation Area; south on North Shore Road (replacing SR 41A) to Lakeshore Road; then west on Lakeshore Road (later Lake Mead Drive, now Lake Mead Parkway), replacing part of SR 41. The terminus was at Lakeshore Road and Boulder Highway (then US 93/US 95, now SR 582).  The highway continued west of Boulder Highway as SR 146.

The northern section along Lake Mead Boulevard lacks the SR 147 designator on the 1983–84 and 1985-86 maps. However, it is back on the 1987-88 map, so it is unclear whether this was a map error or possibly a planned decommissioning that wasn’t carried out.

On the 1998-99 map, the southern section of SR 147 (along Lake Mead Drive) was replaced by an eastward extension of SR 146 (now SR 564).  The entire length of SR 147 is now on Lake Mead Boulevard, with the eastern terminus truncated to the northern border of the Lake Mead National Recreation Area.

Major intersections

Public transport
RTC Transit Route 210 functions on this road.

See also

References

External links

 Nevada DOT Historical Highway Maps

147
Streets in Las Vegas
Streets in North Las Vegas, Nevada